Roman Rabinovich is an Israeli pianist. He was born in Tashkent, Uzbekistan, in 1985 and emigrated with this family to Israel in 1994, where he studied at the Buchmann-Mehta School of Music in Tel Aviv. He was the winner of the 2008 Arthur Rubinstein International Piano Master Competition. He has performed in the United States, Europe, and Israel at places such as Gewandhaus, Wigmore Hall, Carnegie Hall, the Metropolitan Museum of Art, and the John F. Kennedy Center for the Performing Arts. He is a graduate of the Curtis Institute of Music, where he studied with Seymour Lipkin.

References

External links
Official website

Israeli pianists
Living people
21st-century pianists
Year of birth missing (living people)